MSRP may refer to:
 Manufacturer's suggested retail price, in business
 Message Session Relay Protocol, a protocol used for multimedia communications
 Methodology of Scientific Research Programmes of Imre Lakatos
 MSRP Motorsports, a former name of the HP Racing NASCAR team
 Mississippi Republican Party